Codlets are a family, Bregmacerotidae, of cod-like fishes, containing the single genus Bregmaceros found in tropical and subtropical waters throughout the world. They are very small fishes and even the largest, B. lanceolatus, reaches only  in length.

Etymology 
Their scientific name is from Greek bregma meaning the top of the head, and keras meaning "horn"; this refers to their occipital ray (a spine emerging from the top of the head).

Fossil record
Fossils of Bregmaceros are found from the Eocene to the Quaternary (age range: from 37.2 to 0.0 million years ago.).  They are known from various localities in Europe, North America and South America.

Species 
Currently, 14 species in this genus are recognized:
 Bregmaceros arabicus D'Ancona & Cavinato, 1965
 Bregmaceros atlanticus Goode & Bean, 1886 (antenna codlet)
 Bregmaceros bathymaster D. S. Jordan & Bollman, 1890 (codlet)
 Bregmaceros cantori Milliken & Houde, 1984 (striped codlet)
 Bregmaceros cayorum Nichols, 1952
 Bregmaceros houdei Saksena & Richards, 1986 (stellate codlet)
 Bregmaceros japonicus S. Tanaka (I), 1908 (Japanese codlet)
 Bregmaceros lanceolatus S. C. Shen, 1960
 Bregmaceros mcclellandi W. Thompson, 1840 (spotted codlet, Macclelland's unicorn-cod, unicorn cod)
 Bregmaceros nectabanus Whitley, 1941 (smallscale codlet)
 Bregmaceros neonectabanus S. Masuda, Ozawa & Tabeta, 1986
 Bregmaceros pescadorus S. C. Shen, 1960
 Bregmaceros pseudolanceolatus Torii, Javonillo & Ozawa, 2004 (false lance codlet)
 Bregmaceros rarisquamosus Munro, 1950 (big-eye unicorn-cod)

References 

 

Bregmacerotidae